Emporia Municipal Airport  is a city-owned public-use airport, located five miles south of Emporia, in Lyon County, Kansas.

Facilities
It has two runways: 1/19 is 4,999 by 100 feet (1,524 x 30 m) asphalt and 6/24 is 3,875 by 298 feet (1,181 x 91 m) turf.

In the year ending October 31, 2006 the airport had 31,250 aircraft operations, average 85 per day: 96% general aviation, 3% air taxi and 1% military. 45 aircraft were then based at the airport: 67% single-engine, 7% multi-engine, 2% jet, 2% helicopter and 22% ultralight.

References

External links 
 Airport page at City of Emporia website
 Aerial photo as of 14 October 1991 from USGS The National Map
 

Airports in Kansas
Buildings and structures in Lyon County, Kansas
Emporia, Kansas